Ntinos Hadjinicolas (13 May 1955 – 11 January 2022) was a Cypriot politician. A member of the Progressive Party of Working People, he served in the House of Representatives from 2003 to 2011. He died on 11 January 2022, at the age of 66.

References

1955 births
2022 deaths
Greek Cypriot politicians
Progressive Party of Working People politicians
Members of the House of Representatives (Cyprus)
People from Limassol District